Philip Santo  (7 August 1818 – 17 December 1889) was a South Australian politician and businessman.

History
Santo was born at Saltash, Cornwall, and trained to be a carpenter. At the age of 22 he left for South Australia on the ship Brightman, arriving in Adelaide in December 1840. He worked as a builder in Adelaide, then Burra. He moved to Melbourne during the rush to the Victorian goldfields but soon returned to set up a shop in Grote Street near Victoria Square in 1857, then Waymouth Street from 1866, then from 1873 as Philip Santo & Co in Waymouth Street and Lipson Street Port Adelaide; initially selling timber. then building materials then general hardware, riverboats and ships. By 1880 they had diversified into such disparate goods as patent medicines, perfumes and flavourings, American waggons, brooms, "kerosine", "gasoline" and cabinet organs. 
He was reported as the 1867 purchaser of Levi & Watt's newly-completed warehouse at 96 King William Street (now the site of the Commonwealth Bank) which became a warehouse for drapery wholesaler D. & W. Murray, but it appears he was acting for one T. Martin, an English investor.

In 1880 his company erected a new building on Waymouth Street, designed by architect D. Garlick. Tenants included Conigrave & Collison, agents and patent attorneys, and the S.A. Chamber of Manufactures.
Santo's company ceased advertising around 1890.

Santo was elected to the South Australian House of Assembly in 1860 for the City of Adelaide district, 1862 and 1865 for East Adelaide then in 1868 for Barossa and was appointed Commissioner of Public works on a number of occasions for various periods, first in the Waterhouse cabinet, then with Henry Ayers to 1868. He lost his seat in 1870, during which year he was elected to the Legislative Council and held that seat for 21 years. 

He was an active member of the Christian Church, of which Rev. Thomas Playford and Herbert Hussey were contemporary adherents, and as an Elder frequently preached in their chapels in Grote Street and Bentham Street.

He had residences "Clapham Park" in Mitcham and "Fernleigh House" on West Terrace, Adelaide, where he died.

Family
Santo married Elizabeth Pean (23 September 1816 – 28 February 1904); they had four daughters and one son:
Mary Maynard Santo (1841–1941) married James Shaw Greer (1835–1890), later mayor of Unley
Elizabeth Hooper Santo (1845–1923) married James Smith (c. 1842–1900), a business partner of P. Santo, lived at Semaphore
Jane Santo (1848–1875) married Rev. Thomas Jefferson Gore MA (1839–1923) of the Grote St. church in 1868
Sarah Santo (1850–1945) married Rev. Thomas Jefferson Gore MA (1839–1923) on 5 October 1876
Esther Santo (1852–1941)
Philip Santo, Jr., (11 December 1842 – 13 June 1868) married Albertina Kidner (c. 1845 – 10 December 1909) on 9 October 1866. Philip was a prize-winning student at Adelaide Educational Institution, and worked for a time in his father's shop and had a promising future, but died at an early age from diphtheria, leaving a wife and two daughters, Albertina Mary Santo and Amelia Elizabeth Santo (both married Messent boys). His widow, Albertina, married Dr. W. G. Torr (1853–1939) on 20 December 1892.

References

 

|-

1818 births
1889 deaths
Members of the South Australian House of Assembly
Members of the South Australian Legislative Council
People from Saltash
19th-century Australian politicians
Australian people of Cornish descent
British emigrants to Australia